The  was a ship class of four cruisers built for the Imperial Japanese Navy (IJN) during the 1930s. They were initially classified as light cruisers under the weight and armament restrictions of the London Naval Treaty. After Japan abrogated that agreement, all four ships were rearmed with larger guns and reclassified as heavy cruisers. All participated in World War II and were sunk.

Design

For the 1931 Fleet Replenishment Program, believing themselves understrength in cruisers, the IJN chose to build to the maximum allowed by the Washington Naval Treaty. This resulted in the choice of  guns in five triple turrets (a first for Japan) in the Mogamis, also capable of 55° elevation, making the Mogamis one of the very few classes of cruiser to have a dual purpose (DP) main battery; this was coupled with very heavy anti-aircraft protection, as well as the standard reloadable, turreted torpedo launchers, also unique to the IJN.

To save weight and improve transverse stability, the class was given a more compact and lower superstructure, made of aluminium, which was welded rather than riveted. Only ten boilers could be fit under the weight limits (compared to twelve in the previous  and  classes), and the chimney arrangement was designed to minimize weight as well; the middle funnel featured no chimney of its own, instead venting its exhaust gasses into the underside of the forward chimney, which itself was reclined from its base so that, at its top, it merged with the aft funnel's chimney. Protection, however, was not stinted on; the class proved able to take substantial punishment.

The declared weight was 8,500 tons, though the true design weight was 9,500 and at trials they would displace 11,169 tons.

The designers, however, had overreached; excessive topweight led to instability, and gunnery trials revealed cracking hull welds.

Following Japan's withdrawal from the Second London Naval Treaty, plans were made to modernize and expand the entire fleet. Indeed, the designers had designed the class in mind so that the 6-inch guns could be switched with 8-inch batteries, in effect making them heavy cruisers and skirting the London Naval Treaty, though the Japanese had withdrawn from the conference and were not signatories to the Second London Naval Treaty of 1936.

The United States Navy's s were designed specifically to counter the Mogami class, and as a result had a very similar armament to the pre-refit Mogamis, in a nearly identical layout, although the US-pattern 6-inch/47-caliber gun was semi-automatic, with a higher rate of fire and the three weapons in each turret mounted in a single sleeve. Japan's choice of the 155 mm gun caliber is curious, as Japan already had a 6-inch (152 mm) weapon in service, of nearly equal performance. In spite of the resulting multiplicity of similar gun calibers, Japan resented the 5-5-3 treaty ratios, and had vowed to build to the very limit allowed by the 1922 Washington and 1930 London Naval Treaties. As the French had already used a 155 mm main battery in the three s (1922–1926), this became the largest gun caliber allowed for light cruisers under the 1930 London Naval Treaty. This line of reasoning is wrong though: The shell of the 155mm version of the gun weighed 56kg versus 45kg of the ever so slightly smaller caliber. The new gun was a new design, not a minor modification to an existing design.

War service
All four ships participated in the Japanese invasion of the Dutch East Indies.

The heavily damaged Mogami limped home and spent ten months in yard, during which her afterparts were completely rebuilt, and "X" and "Y" turrets were replaced by a flight deck (with the intention to operate 11 aircraft).

In October 1944, the survivors were reunited at the Battle of Leyte Gulf. Mogami, heavily damaged by a collision with the cruiser , cruiser gunfire, and aerial attack, was scuttled by the destroyer , while Kumano limped into Manila harbor on one boiler, to be sunk by Halsey's aviators on 25 November 1944; the US escort carrier planes mauled Suzuya at Leyte, which was scuttled by the destroyer  on 25 October.

Criticism
This class is seen by naval architects as trying to fit a quart into a pint pot. The IJN's Naval staff insisted that each new class be superior to anything else in its category, which placed an enormous burden on Japanese naval constructors and the difficulties with these ships have to be seen in this light.

The initial construction was extremely light in order to comply with the naval treaties and had to be remedied. When the Royal Navy's Director of Naval Construction (DNC) was told about these ships by British Naval Intelligence, quoting the public displacement figure, he replied that the capabilities quoted could not be achieved on this displacement and that "they must be building their ships out of cardboard or lying".

Ships

References

Bibliography

External links

Cruiser classes
 
Cruisers of the Imperial Japanese Navy
Ships built in Japan